The Pontifical Biblical Commission is a pontifical commission established within the Roman Curia to ensure the proper interpretation and defense of the Bible.

Since 1988, it has been closely attached to the Congregation for the Doctrine of the Faith, whose prefect heads the Commission. In March 2022, Pope Francis reaffirmed that relationship with his apostolic constitution Praedicate evangelium, effective 5 June 2022, even as it changed the Congregation's name to the Dicastery for the Doctrine of the Faith.

1901–1971

The Pontifical Biblical Commission was established as a committee of cardinals, aided by consultors, who met in Rome to ensure the proper interpretation and defense of Sacred Scripture. This function was outlined in the encyclical Providentissimus Deus.

The first appointments to the commission were in August, 1901, but it was not formally established by Pope Leo XIII until October 30, 1902, with the Apostolic Letter Vigilantiae Studiique. The first commission was composed of three cardinals and 12 consultors.

The consultors met twice a month, with secretaries present. The secretaries reported to the cardinals on the commission, who met on the 2nd and 4th Sundays of each month. The cardinals proposed questions for the consultors to consider and voted on the answers received from the consultors. The cardinals could send questions back to the consultors for further study, commission a single consultor to investigate a matter more deeply, or sanction or modifying the study results. If a decision was reached, the secretaries reported to the Pope, who could send the matter back for further study, or ratify the results of the study.

The duties of the commission were:
 to protect and defend the integrity of the Catholic Faith in Biblical matters
 to further the progress of exposition of the Sacred Books, taking account of all recent discoveries
 to decide controversies on grave questions which might arise among Catholic scholars
 to give answers to Catholics throughout the world who may consult the commission
 to see that the Vatican Library was properly furnished with codices and necessary books
 to publish studies on Scripture as occasion might demand.

The commission was granted the power to grant pontifical academic degrees in biblical studies by Pope Pius X's Apostolic Letter Scripturae sanctae of February 23, 1904. Pope Pius XI, by the Motu Proprio Bibliorum scientia of April 27, 1924, and the Apostolic Constitution Deus scientiarum Dominus of May 24, 1931, clarified that such degrees were equivalent in status to those of the Pontifical Universities.

1971–88
The Motu Proprio Sedula Cura ("On New Laws Regulating the Pontifical Biblical Commission, June 27, 1971") was issued on that date, by which Pope Paul VI completely restructured the commission and attached it to the Congregation for the Doctrine of the Faith as a consultative body.

Since 1988
On 28 June 1988, Pope John Paul II's Apostolic Constitution Pastor Bonus confirmed the commission's relationship to the Congregation for the Doctrine of the Faith, with the prefect of the Congregation for the Doctrine of the Faith the ex officio president of the Pontifical Biblical Commission. The Commission has its own secretary, who to date has been a professor of the Pontifical Biblical Institute. Since 9 March 2021 the secretary has been Núria Calduch, the first female secretary.

The members are Catholic biblical scholars proposed by the Bishops' Conferences. In 2014 Pope Francis appointed women to the commission for the first time, including Mary Healy.

See also
 Catholic theology of Scripture
 Pontifical commission

Notes

External links
 Pontifical Biblical Commission website

 
1902 establishments in Italy
Catholic organizations established in the 20th century
Catholic theology and doctrine
Christian organizations established in 1902
Pontifical commissions